The 2018 Wimbledon Championships are described below in detail, in the form of day-by-day summaries.

All dates are BST (UTC+1).

Day 1 (2 July)
Seeds out:
Gentlemen's Singles:  Grigor Dimitrov [6],  Borna Ćorić [16],  Richard Gasquet [23],  Filip Krajinović [28],  Leonardo Mayer [32]
Ladies' Singles:  Sloane Stephens [4],  Elina Svitolina [5],  CoCo Vandeweghe [16],  Magdaléna Rybáriková [19],  Anastasija Sevastova [21],  Zhang Shuai [31]
Schedule of play

Day 2 (3 July)
Seeds out:
Gentlemen's Singles:  Dominic Thiem [7],  David Goffin [10],  Jack Sock [18],  Pablo Carreño Busta [20],  Marco Cecchinato [29],  Fernando Verdasco [30]
Ladies' Singles:  Caroline Garcia [6],  Petra Kvitová [8],  Maria Sharapova [24],  Anastasia Pavlyuchenkova [30]
Schedule of play

Day 3 (4 July)
Seeds out:
Gentlemen's Singles:  Lucas Pouille [17]
Ladies' Singles:  Caroline Wozniacki [2],  Agnieszka Radwańska [32]
Gentlemen's Doubles:  Ivan Dodig /  Rajeev Ram [10] 
Schedule of play

Day 4 (5 July)
Seeds out:
Gentlemen's Singles:  Marin Čilić [3],  Diego Schwartzman [14],  Denis Shapovalov [26],  Damir Džumhur [27]
Ladies' Singles:  Garbiñe Muguruza [3],  Johanna Konta [22]
Gentlemen's Doubles:  Henri Kontinen /  John Peers [3],  Max Mirnyi /  Philipp Oswald [16]
Ladies' Doubles:  Lyudmyla Kichenok /  Alla Kudryavtseva [16]
Schedule of play

Day 5 (6 July)
Seeds out:
Gentlemen's Singles:  Sam Querrey [11],  Philipp Kohlschreiber [25]
Ladies' Singles:  Venus Williams [9],  Madison Keys [10],  Barbora Strýcová [23],  Mihaela Buzărnescu [29]
Gentlemen's Doubles:  Oliver Marach /  Mate Pavić [1],  Łukasz Kubot /  Marcelo Melo [2],  Aisam-ul-Haq Qureshi /  Jean-Julien Rojer [9],  Pablo Cuevas /  Marcel Granollers [11],  Rohan Bopanna /  Édouard Roger-Vasselin [12]
Ladies' Doubles:  Latisha Chan /  Peng Shuai [5],  Chan Hao-ching /  Yang Zhaoxuan [7],  Raquel Atawo /  Anna-Lena Grönefeld [11]
Schedule of play

Day 6 (7 July)
Seeds out:
Gentlemen's Singles:  Alexander Zverev [4],  Nick Kyrgios [15],  Fabio Fognini [19],  Kyle Edmund [21]
Ladies' Singles:  Simona Halep [1],  Elise Mertens [15],  Ashleigh Barty [17],  Naomi Osaka [18],  Daria Gavrilova [26],  Carla Suárez Navarro [27],  Anett Kontaveit [28]
Gentlemen's Doubles:  Pierre-Hugues Herbert /  Nicolas Mahut [4]
Mixed Doubles:  Marcelo Demoliner /  María José Martínez Sánchez [15]
Schedule of play

Middle Sunday (8 July)
Following tradition, Middle Sunday is a day of rest and no matches are played.

Day 7 (9 July)
Seeds out:
Gentlemen's Singles:  Adrian Mannarino [22],  Stefanos Tsitsipas [31]
Ladies' Singles:  Karolína Plíšková [7]
Gentlemen's Doubles:  Juan Sebastián Cabal /  Robert Farah [6],  Nikola Mektić /  Alexander Peya [8]
Ladies' Doubles:  Andrea Sestini Hlaváčková /  Barbora Strýcová [2],  Andreja Klepač /  María José Martínez Sánchez [4],  Elise Mertens /  Demi Schuurs [8],  Kiki Bertens /  Johanna Larsson [9],  Kirsten Flipkens /  Monica Niculescu [13],  Lucie Hradecká /  Hsieh Su-wei [14],  Vania King /  Katarina Srebotnik [17]
Mixed Doubles:  Robert Farah /  Anna-Lena Grönefeld [7],  Max Mirnyi /  Květa Peschke [13]
Schedule of play

Day 8 (10 July)
Seeds out:
Ladies' Singles:  Daria Kasatkina [14],  Kiki Bertens [20]
Gentlemen's Doubles:  Jamie Murray /  Bruno Soares [5],  Ben McLachlan /  Jan-Lennard Struff [14]
Mixed Doubles:  Mate Pavić /  Gabriela Dabrowski [1],  Édouard Roger-Vasselin /  Andrea Sestini Hlaváčková [6],  Henri Kontinen /  Heather Watson [16]
Schedule of play

Day 9 (11 July)
Seeds out:
Gentlemen's Singles:  Roger Federer [1],  Juan Martín del Potro [5],  Milos Raonic [13],  Kei Nishikori [24]
Ladies' Doubles:  Tímea Babos /  Kristina Mladenovic [1],  Irina-Camelia Begu /  Mihaela Buzărnescu [15]
Mixed Doubles:  Nikola Mektić /  Chan Hao-ching [5],  Matwé Middelkoop /  Johanna Larsson [12]
Schedule of play

Day 10 (12 July)
Seeds out:
Ladies' Singles:  Jeļena Ostapenko [12],  Julia Görges [13]
Gentlemen's Doubles:  Dominic Inglot [15] /  Franko Škugor [15]
Mixed Doubles:  Bruno Soares /  Ekaterina Makarova [2],  Ivan Dodig /  Latisha Chan [3],  Jean-Julien Rojer /  Demi Schuurs [4],  Juan Sebastián Cabal [10] /  Abigail Spears [10]
Schedule of play

Day 11 (13 July)
Seeds out:
Gentlemen's Singles:  John Isner [9]
Ladies' Doubles:  Gabriela Dabrowski /  Xu Yifan [6]
Mixed Doubles:  Michael Venus /  Katarina Srebotnik [9]
Schedule of play

Day 12 (14 July)
Seeds out:
Gentlemen's Singles:  Rafael Nadal [2]
Ladies' Singles:  Serena Williams [25]
Gentlemen's Doubles:  Raven Klaasen /  Michael Venus [13]
Ladies' Doubles:  Nicole Melichar /  Květa Peschke [12]
Schedule of play

Day 13 (15 July)
Seeds out:
Gentlemen's Singles:  Kevin Anderson [8]
Schedule of play

2018 Wimbledon Championships
Wimbledon Championships by year – Day-by-day summaries